Barrow Hill and New Whittington is one of the nineteen wards that make up the borough of Chesterfield, Derbyshire. The population of the ward was 5,903 at the 2011 Census.

Barrow Hill is a small semi-rural residential area situated approximately four miles from Chesterfield Town Centre.

Whittington is split into two villages - Old and New; Old Whittington is a separate ward.

Ward elections
The ward currently elects three councillors, who sit on the borough council.

Results of the local elections, 3 May 2007.

Results of the local elections, 1 May 2003.

References

Wards of Derbyshire
Chesterfield, Derbyshire